Jafarabad-e Olya (also Romanized as Ja‘farābād-e ‘Olyā) is a village in Mirbag-e Shomali Rural District, in the Central District of Delfan County, Lorestan Province, Iran. At the 2006 census, its population was 232, in 49 families.

References 

Towns and villages in Delfan County